Scooby-Doo (also known as Scooby-Doo: The Movie) is a 2002 American fantasy adventure-comedy film based on the long-running animated franchise of the same name. The first installment in the Scooby-Doo live-action film series, the film was directed by Raja Gosnell from a screenplay by James Gunn, and stars Freddie Prinze Jr., Sarah Michelle Gellar, Matthew Lillard, Linda Cardellini and Rowan Atkinson. The plot revolves around Mystery Incorporated, a group of four young adults and a talking dog who solve mysteries, who reunite after a two-year disbandment to investigate a mystery at a popular horror-themed tropical island resort.

Filmed in and around Queensland, Australia, on a budget of $84 million, Scooby-Doo was released on June 14, 2002, and grossed $275 million worldwide. Reggae artist Shaggy and rock group MxPx performed different versions of the Scooby-Doo, Where Are You! theme song. The Scooby-Doo Spooky Coaster, a ride based on the film, was built at Warner Bros. Movie World in Gold Coast, Australia in 2002. The film received generally negative reviews from critics, who criticized its script and humor, although Lillard’s performance was praised and the movie later gained a cult following from fans of the show. A sequel, Scooby-Doo 2: Monsters Unleashed, was released on March 26, 2004.

Plot 
After Mystery, Inc. solves the mystery of the Luna Ghost at a factory, long-brewing friction between Fred, a glory hog; Daphne, who has become sick of being the one who gets captured; and Velma, from whom Fred regularly steals credit for her plans, causes the gang to disband, abandoning a dismayed Scooby and Shaggy and leaving them to care for the gang's van, The Mystery Machine. Two years later, they are all invited to solve a mystery on horror-themed tropical resort Spooky Island, whose owner, Emile Mondavarious, believes the visiting tourists are being cursed.

While Shaggy and Scooby hope this will bring the gang back together, Velma, Fred and Daphne are all intent on solving the mystery on their own. Velma attends a ritualistic performance given by actor N'Goo Tuana and his henchman, famous luchador Zarkos. N'Goo claims ancient demons once ruled the island but have been plotting revenge ever since they were displaced by the resort. Meanwhile, Shaggy falls for a girl named Mary Jane, distancing himself from Scooby in the process.

They are all led to the resort's haunted house ride, where Fred and Velma encounter a schoolroom that educates inhuman creatures about human culture, while Daphne discovers a pyramid-shaped artifact called the Daemon Ritus. Fred, Velma and Mondavarious are kidnapped and later possessed by the island's demons. Mary Jane calls the Coast Guard for help, but they don't arrive. The next day, after trying and failing to tell Shaggy that Mary Jane is a demon in disguise, Scooby goes missing as well; Zarkos steals back the Daemon Ritus from Daphne, who is also captured and possessed.

Shaggy goes in search of his friends and finds a vat of protoplasm containing the souls of those possessed. He finds and frees the souls of Daphne, Fred and Velma, who discovers sunlight destroys the demons. A voodoo priest who lives on the island informs the gang the demons are to perform their "Darpokalypse" Ritual, which will see them rule the world for ten thousand years if a pure soul is sacrificed in the Daemon Ritus. The gang realizes that the pure soul is Scooby, whom Mondavarious brought to Spooky Island for this very reason. Fred, Daphne, and Velma finally realizes their mistake, they decide to put aside their differences and work together with Shaggy to save Scooby.

The gang infiltrate the ritual, where Mondavarious is foiled in sacrificing Scooby's soul by Shaggy. Mondavarious is revealed to be a robot controlled by Scooby's estranged nephew Scrappy-Doo, whom the gang abandoned long ago after his increasingly power-hungry and egomaniacal nature got out of control. Absorbing the tourists' souls, Scrappy transforms into a huge monster and tries to kill the gang. Daphne knocks Zarkos into the vat, returning most of the other souls to their bodies and releasing the demons, who are promptly killed by Daphne reflecting sunlight through a skull-shaped disco ball. Shaggy frees the rest of the souls, reversing Scrappy's transformation in the process and finds the real Mondavarious imprisoned, having been captured by Scrappy so he could pose as his double. Scrappy and his henchmen are all arrested and Mystery, Inc. reunites.

Cast 

 Freddie Prinze Jr. as Fred Jones
 Sarah Michelle Gellar as Daphne Blake
 Matthew Lillard as Norville "Shaggy" Rogers
 Linda Cardellini as Velma Dinkley
 Rowan Atkinson as Emile Mondavarious / Fake Emile Mondavarious
 Miguel A. Nunez Jr. as Voodoo Maestro
 Isla Fisher as Mary Jane
Neil Fanning voices the titular character, Scooby-Doo. Scott Innes reprises his role as the voice of Scrappy-Doo and J.P. Manoux voices Scrappy Rex. Sam Greco portrays Zarkos; Steven Grieves portrays N'Goo Tuana; Kristian Schmid portrays Brad; and Michala Banas portrays Carol.

Additionally, Holly Brisley appears as a Training Video Woman. Frank Welker and Jess Harnell voice the creatures. Sugar Ray, Pamela Anderson, and Nicholas Hope appeared in cameo roles.

Production

Development 

Producer Charles Roven began developing a live-action treatment of Scooby-Doo in 1994. By the end of the decade, the combined popularity of Scooby-Doo, Where Are You!, along with the addition of the script and updated digital animation led Warner Bros. to fast track production of the film. Mike Myers was reported to be co-writing the screenplay with Jay Kogan in July 1998, and was later on board to play Shaggy as well. In October 2000, the film was officially given the green light. Variety reported that Raja Gosnell had been hired to direct the film.

The movie references several pop-culture fads, particularly the scene in the Mystery Machine. Scooby has a Heinz Kickr's Bottle, there are some mouths-with-eyes toys, Pamela Anderson interviews the main characters in the opening chapter. 
 
The film was shot on location in and around Queensland, Australia. Production was started on February 12, 2001 at the Warner Bros. Movie World theme park, with over 400 cast and crew also taking over Tangalooma Island Resort for six weeks to film all the scenes set on Spooky Island. Production wrapped in June 2001. The film was originally set to have a much darker tone, essentially poking fun at the original series, much like The Brady Bunch Movie, and was set for a PG-13 rating. Shaggy was set to be a stoner, and there were many marijuana references.

Several rumors about these aspects in the original cartoon series were passed around by fans of the original and were to be incorporated into the live action film. Newsweek. June 14, 2002. Available at Lexis-Nexis.</ref> In March 2001, one month into filming, the first official cast picture was released.

According to Sarah Michelle Gellar, after the cast had signed on there was a change, and the film became more family friendly, though some of the original adult jokes are still in the film. They are also included in deleted scenes on the home media releases.  Gellar said her character and Linda Cardellini's shared an onscreen kiss that did not make the final film. "It wasn't just, like, for fun," she said, explaining it took place in the body-switching scene. "Initially in the soul-swapping scene Velma and Daphne couldn't seem to get their souls back together in the woods. And so the way they found was to kiss and the souls went back into proper alignment." 

In 2017, the 15th anniversary of the release of the film, James Gunn, the film's screenwriter, revealed in a Facebook post that there was an R-rated cut of Scooby-Doo and that CGI was used to remove cleavage of the female cast members.

Casting 
Actors Freddie Prinze Jr. and Sarah Michelle Gellar, who both previously worked in I Know What You Did Last Summer and portray Fred and Daphne, are romantically involved in both the film and reality. This film marks the first time in the franchise's history where the characters are portrayed as a couple. The pair married shortly after the film was released. Prinze said of his character, "[He] always showed more arrogance than everyone else. So in the movie, I took the opportunity to make him as narcissistic and self-loving as possible."

Jim Carrey was originally attached to play Shaggy, while Mike Myers also expressed interest in the role. Lochlyn Munro also auditioned for the role. The role was eventually given to Matthew Lillard. When asked about watching several cartoons before playing Shaggy, Lillard responded, "Everything I could get my hands on. If I ever have to see another episode of Scooby-Doo, it will be way too soon." Lillard would continue voicing Shaggy in the rest of the Scooby-Doo media starting in 2010; he would also poke fun at this appearance in the following year's Looney Tunes: Back in Action, where an animated Shaggy and Scooby voice their grievances over Lillard's portrayal over a lunch in the Warner Bros. studio cafeteria and threaten him to make him do a better portrayal in the sequel.

Isla Fisher grew up watching Scooby-Doo in Australia, and said that the "best part of making this movie was being part of an institution, something that has been in people's childhoods and is something that means a lot to a lot of people." Linda Cardellini was also a fan of the Scooby-Doo series.

Filming 
Principal photography began on February 13, 2001, and wrapped on June 1, 2001. Filming took place throughout Queensland, Australia. Spooky Island was filmed on Tangalooma Island resort in Moreton Island.

Soundtrack 

The film's score was composed by David Newman. A soundtrack was released on June 4, 2002, by Atlantic Records. It peaked at number 24 on the Billboard 200 and 49 on the Top R&B/Hip-Hop Albums. Shaggy performs the theme song from Scooby-Doo, Where Are You!, which was retitled "Shaggy, Where Are You?".

Distribution

Marketing 
On November 16, 2001, the first trailer of Scooby-Doo was released in theaters with the opening of Harry Potter and the Sorcerer's Stone. A second trailer debuted with the release of Ice Age and Showtime on March 15, 2002.

A video game based upon the film was released for Game Boy Advance shortly before the film was released. The game is played in third-person point of view and has multiple puzzle games and mini-games. The game's structure was similar to a board game. Metacritic rated it 64/100 based on five reviews, which they labeled as "mixed or average reviews". Meanwhile, Dairy Queen began promoting the film with kids meal toys, frozen cakes and a limited edition Mystery Crunch Blizzard flavor.

Home media 
The film was released on VHS and DVD on October 11, 2002. The release included deleted scenes, among them an alternate opening animated in the style of the original television series. It was later released on Blu-ray on January 16, 2007. Said Blu-ray was given a double feature pack with its sequel, Monsters Unleashed, on November 9, 2010.

Reception

Box office 
Scooby-Doo debuted with $19.2 million on its opening day and $54.1 million over the weekend from 3,447 theaters, averaging about $15,711 per venue and ranking No. 1 at the box office. At the time, it had the second-highest June opening weekend, behind Austin Powers: The Spy Who Shagged Me. During its theatrical run, Scooby-Doo also competed against another family-oriented film, Lilo & Stitch. The film closed on October 31, 2002, with a final gross of $153 million in the United States and Canada. It made an additional $122 million in other territories, bringing the total worldwide gross to $275.7 million, making it the fifteenth most successful film worldwide of 2002. The film was released in the United Kingdom on July 12, 2002, and topped the country's box office for the next two weekends, before being dethroned by Austin Powers in Goldmember.

Critical response 
On review aggregator Rotten Tomatoes, the film has an approval rating of 32% based on 146 reviews with an average rating of 4.6/10. The site's critical consensus reads: "Though Lillard is uncannily spot-on as Shaggy, Scooby Doo is a tired live-action update, filled with lame jokes." On Metacritic, the film received a score of 35 based on 31 reviews, indicating "generally unfavorable reviews". Audiences polled by CinemaScore gave the film an average grade of "B+" on an A+ to F scale.

Roger Ebert of the Chicago Sun-Times gave the film one out of four stars, stating that the film "exists in a closed universe, and the rest of us are aliens. The Internet was invented so that you can find someone else's review of Scooby-Doo. Start surfing." Peter Travers of Rolling Stone said, "Get out your pooper-scoopers. Doo happens June 14th, warn the ads for Scooby-Doo. And they say there's no truth in Hollywood." Chris Hewitt of Empire Magazine gave the film two out of five stars.

Robin Rauzi of the Los Angeles Times called the film "entertainment more disposable than Hanna-Barbera's half-hour cartoons ever were." Although Jay Boyar of the Orlando Sentinel said that children who liked the animated version of Scooby-Doo will "probably like" the film, he urged parents to "know that the violence is a bit harder-edged than in the cartoon version". He would later go on to say that adults who remember the cartoon version "may get caught up in what Scooby would call the 'rostalgia'", but said that "adults who do not fondly recall the Scooby-Doo cartoons are strongly advised to steer clear." Robert K. Elder of the Chicago Tribune gave the film 2 and 1/2 stars out of 4 and wrote, "Screenwriter James Gunn gets it mostly right, remaining fiercely faithful to Mystery Inc. mythology, from integrating Scooby's annoying nephew Scrappy-Doo to Velma's penchant for yelling 'jinkees!' Unlike the lead balloon adaptation 'Josie and the Pussycats,' Scooby-Doo knows when to take itself seriously and when to laugh at itself -- even if its audience isn't laughing along at every gag."

Conversely, Hank Struever of The Washington Post gave the film a positive review, stating that "You don't want to love this, but you will. Although Scooby-Doo falls far short of becoming the Blazing Saddles of Generations X, Y and Z, it is hard to resist in its charms."

Accolades 
Gellar won Choice Movie Actress – Comedy at the Teen Choice Awards. Prinze was nominated for a Golden Raspberry Award (Razzie) for Worst Supporting Actor, but he lost to Hayden Christensen for Star Wars: Episode II – Attack of the Clones. It was also nominated for another Razzie, Most Flatulent Teen-Targeted Movie, but lost against Jackass: The Movie. It won the Kids' Choice Award for Favorite Fart in a Movie.

Other media

Sequel 
A sequel, Scooby-Doo 2: Monsters Unleashed, was released in 2004. A third film was planned, but cancelled after the poor critical and financial results of the second.

Reboots 
In 2009 and 2010, two telefilm reboots, Scooby-Doo! The Mystery Begins and Scooby-Doo! Curse of the Lake Monster, aired on Cartoon Network. In 2018, a direct-to-video film titled Daphne & Velma, with no connection to the previous Scooby-Doo films, was released in 2018.

Animated reboot 
An animated film, Scoob!, was released on May 15, 2020.

Notes

References

External links 

 
 
 
 
 

2002 films
2000s adventure comedy films
2000s buddy comedy films
2000s English-language films
2000s fantasy comedy films
2000s ghost films
2000s comedy mystery films
American adventure comedy films
American buddy comedy films
American children's adventure films
American children's comedy films
American comedy horror films
American detective films
American fantasy adventure films
American fantasy comedy films
American films with live action and animation
Atlas Entertainment films
Body swapping in films
Children's horror films
Cultural depictions of Pamela Anderson
Demons in film
Films about dogs
Films about spring break
American films about revenge
Films directed by Raja Gosnell
Films produced by Charles Roven
Films produced by Richard Suckle
Films scored by David Newman
Films set in amusement parks
Films set in factories
Films set on fictional islands
Films shot in Brisbane
Hanna-Barbera animated films
Scooby-Doo (film series)
Scooby-Doo live-action films
Films with screenplays by Craig Titley
Films with screenplays by James Gunn
Films about spirit possession
Warner Bros. films
American children's animated comedy films
2002 comedy films
Films shot at Village Roadshow Studios
American supernatural comedy films
2000s American films